Harold Leroy Enarson (May 24, 1919 in Villisca, Iowa – July 28, 2006 in Washington) was the 9th President of Ohio State University. Prior to joining Ohio State, he served as the first President of Cleveland State University, from 1966 to 1972.

After leaving the university, Enarson commented that he would be remembered most for his firing of popular Ohio State Buckeyes football coach Woody Hayes after Hayes punched an opposing player in the throat, though events such as Archie Griffin's two Heisman Trophies or graduate Paul Flory's Nobel Prize were highpoints.  Ohio State President Karen Holbrook said of Enarson, "Today, Ohio State’s programs are stronger and its reputation more eminent, thanks to Harold Enarson."

References

Further reading
Past Presidents of the Ohio State University

Presidents of Ohio State University
Presidents of Cleveland State University
2006 deaths
1919 births
20th-century American academics